Rania may refer to:

Places
 Rania, Haryana, a City in Sirsa District, Haryana state of India.
 Ranya, a district in Sulaymaniyah Governorate, Iraqi Kurdistan
 Rania block, a community development block, in Jharkhand, India
 Rania, Khunti, a village in Jharkhand, India

People
Rania or Raniah (Arabic: رَانِيَة rāniyah), also spelt Raniya, Raniyah, is an Arabic female given name. The name stems from the Arabic auxiliary verb ranā ilayhi (رَنَا إِلَيْهِ), literally implies "as long as looking at the person with a stillness of a blink or wink, or the predominant response". 

This auxiliary verb is derived from the verb rāna (رَانَ) meaning "predominate, prevail, reign in, overcome, overwhelm, seize", and include several meanings like "getting over (win something over), conquering, mastering" or "conceal, be covered, fill up".

Rania Al Abdullah (born 1970),  Queen consort of Jordan 
 Rania Elwani (born 1977), Egyptian swimmer
 Rania Mamoun (born 1979), Sudanese journalist and novelist
 Rania Hussein Muhammad Tawfiq, known as Ruby (born 1981), Egyptian singer
 Rania Zeriri (born 1986), Dutch singer

Entertainment
 Rania, a former name of the South Korean girl group Blackswan
 Rânia, a 2012 Brazilian drama film

Arabic feminine given names